The 2018 Women's Four Nations Cup was the eighth Hockey Four Nations Cup, an international women's field hockey tournament, consisting of a series of test matches. It was held in Germany, from July 11 to 14, 2018, and featured four of the top nations in women's field hockey.

Competition format
The tournament featured the national teams of Argentina, Netherlands, New Zealand, and the hosts, Germany, competing in a round-robin format, with each team playing each other once. Three points will be awarded for a win, one for a draw, and none for a loss.

Results

Matches

Statistics

Goalscorers
2 Goals

  Noel Barrionuevo 
  Delfina Merino 
  Shiloh Gloyn 
  Frédérique Matla
  Lauren Stam

1 Goal

  Agustina Albertario 
  Martina Cavallero 
  Lisa Altenburg 
  Marie Mävers 
  Anne Schröder 
  Xan de Waard
  Margot van Geffen
  Caia van Maasakker
  Maria Verschoor
  Lidewij Welten
  Madison Doar 
  Anita McLaren 
  Brooke Neal 
  Amy Robinson

References

2018
2018 in women's field hockey
field hockey
field hockey
field hockey
field hockey
July 2018 sports events in Germany